Sangdo Station is a station on the Seoul Subway Line 7.

Prior to the opening of Heukseok station on Line 9, Sangdo's subname was 'Chung-Ang Univ.'. However, in June 2009, the subname was removed because of the opening of 'Heukseok (Chung-Ang Univ.)'.

Station layout

Metro stations in Dongjak District
Seoul Metropolitan Subway stations
Railway stations opened in 2000